Farghānī (meaning from Farghāna), or Al-Farghani is a common surname in Central and Western Asia and was a common nisbat in the medieval Islamic world. It may refer to the following:
 Ahmad ibn Muhammad ibn Kathīr al-Farghānī, also known as Alfraganus, a 9th-century astronomer
 Rustum ibn Bardu al-Farghani, 10th-century Abbasid commander and governor of Tarsus
 Siraj al-Din al-Ushi al-Farghani, 12th century Hanafi-Maturidi scholar
 Sayf-i Farghānī, a 13th-century Persian poet
 Sa'id al-Din Farghani, a 13th-century Sufi author
 Abu Abdullah b. Ahmad b. Ja'far al-Farghani, the student of al-Tabari who wrote the appendix, al-Sila, to History of the Prophets and Kings.

See also 
 Fergani (disambiguation), a surname of North African origin

Nisbas